Sānshílǐpù (三十里铺) may refer to:

 Sanshilipu, Fuyang, town in Yingzhou District, Fuyang, Anhui, China
 Sanshilipu, Gaotang County, town in Gaotang County, Shandong, China